Dr. Plummet's House of Flux is a video game developed by MicroIllusions in 1989 for the Amiga.

Plot
The unusual Dr. Plummet has invited the player character to his House of Flux to test the player's skills on four different missions, each with seven levels. Each level has a specific theme, with differing backgrounds and obstacles that relate to that theme. The player flies a ship equipped with a gun and shield to rescue six astronauts held captive in each level, avoiding or destroying obstacles such as walls, guns, bases, and weird things created by Dr. Plummet.

Gameplay
The player operates the ship using a joystick. Moving the joystick to the left or right rotates the ship in a counter-clockwise or clockwise direction. Pushing forward on the joystick thrusts the ship forward. Pressing the joystick button fires the guns, and the space bar raises shields that protect the ship from some obstacles and enemy fire. Running out of fuel causes the ship to rotate aimlessly.

Reception
In 1990, Dragon gave the game 2 out of 5 stars.

Reviews
The Games Machine - Mar, 1990
ASM (Aktueller Software Markt) - Mar, 1990

References

1989 video games
Amiga games
Amiga-only games
MicroIllusions games
Simulation video games
Video games developed in the United States